Melvin Mooney (1893–1968) was an American physicist and rheologist.

Life

Mooney was born in Kansas City, Missouri. He achieved an A.B. degree from the University of Missouri in 1917 and a PhD in physics from the University of Chicago in 1923. He worked for the United States Rubber Company.

He developed the Mooney viscometer (used to measure viscosity of rubber compounds during curing) and other testing equipment used in the rubber industry. He also proposed the Mooney-Rivlin solid constitutive law describing the hyperelastic stress–strain behavior of rubber. He was the first recipient of the Bingham Medal from the Society of Rheology in 1948. He received the Charles Goodyear Medal in 1962. He is the namesake of the Melvin Mooney Distinguished Technology Award of the American Chemical Society Rubber Division.

References

External links 
 A photograph of Melvin Mooney from 
 Audio interview with Melvin Mooney.

Polymer scientists and engineers
1893 births
1968 deaths
Rheologists
20th-century American physicists
Solid mechanics
Scientists from Kansas City, Missouri
University of Missouri alumni
University of Chicago alumni
Physicists from Missouri
Scientists from Missouri
University of Missouri physicists
Fellows of the American Physical Society